The Barasat District Sports Stadium, also known as Vidyasagar Krirangan, is an association football stadium located in Barasat, North 24 Parganas, West Bengal. It is used mostly for Calcutta Football League matches. It is also used for several district-level, state-level and sometimes national level tournaments. The stadium currently holds around 15,000 spectators, has four floodlight towers, air conditioned function and changing rooms. The artificial turf at the stadium has achieved a two-star rating from FIFA.

Since the 2014–15 season, the stadium has hosted the home matches of Mohun Bagan A.C. and East Bengal in the I-League.

References

Football venues in West Bengal
Sports venues in Kolkata
Barasat
Year of establishment missing